Trend is an Austrian weekly business magazine headquartered in Vienna. The magazine is one of the oldest publications in its category in the country.

History and profile
Trend, based in Vienna, was established in 1969 by Oscar Bronner, being the first independent business magazine in Austria.

In 1974 Trend was sold to the Verlagsgruppe NEWS. The magazine was published monthly with a size of 210 x 280 mm. It targets senior executives, entrepreneurs and decision-makers as well as Austria's intelligentsia. It is among the pioneers of investigative journalism in the country and publishes a list of Best Workplaces in Austria.

Trend merged with its sister magazine Format, another business magazine, in December 2015. At the same time its frequency was switched to weekly from 22 January 2016.

Circulation
In the mid-1980s Trend had a circulation of 72,000 copies. The monthly sold 68,000 copies in 2003. Its circulation was 50,000 copies in 2007. The circulation of the magazine was 60,067 copies in 2010. It decreased to 47,248 copies during the first half of 2013.

See also
 List of magazines in Austria

References

External links

1969 establishments in Austria
Business magazines
German-language magazines
Magazines established in 1969
Magazines published in Vienna
Monthly magazines published in Austria
Weekly magazines published in Austria